Pratapgarh was a Rajput estate or Jagir of Oudh, India. The rulers of the estate were originally ruling from a place known as Taroul or Tiroul near Allahabad. The ancestor of the family was Babu Sujan Shah, son of Raja Sangram Shah of Tiroul. Later a descendant, Babu Pratap Singh (1628–1683) came to the region known as Rampur and built a fort, and gave the city its current name, Pratapgarh.

Raja's of Pratapgarh
Babu Pratap Singh (1628–1682)
Babu Jai Singh (1682–1728)
Babu Chhataradari Singh 
Babu Prithvipat Singh
Babu Duniapat Singh
Raja Bahadur Singh
Raja Abhiman Singh
Raja Gulab Singh
Raja Ajit Singh (1877–1889)
Raja Pratap Bahadur Singh (1889–1921)
Raja Ajit Pratap Singh (1921–2000), crowned at the age of four, Member of Parliament of 3rd & 4th Lok Sabha.
Raja Abhay Pratap Singh (2000–2013), Member of Parliament of 10th Lok Sabha.
Raja Anil Pratap Singh (2013–present)

Other estates in Pratapgarh district 
Kalakankar
Bhadri was an estate near Kunda of Pratapgarh.

References

History of Uttar Pradesh
Pratapgarh district, Uttar Pradesh
Rajput estates
Zamindari estates